Samuel Monin (born 3 November 1979 in Senegal) is a Senegalese retired footballer.

Career

After failing to make an appearance for French Ligue 1 side AS Monaco, Monin signed for Raith Rovers in the Scottish second division. While playing for them in 2001, he was linked with Celtic, one of the most successful Scottish teams, as well as English clubs Liverpool,   Leicester City, Blackburn Rovers, and Bradford City. However, he never signed for any of those outfits.

In 2001, Monin made his solitary appearance for the Senegal national team, in a 2–4 loss to Burkina Faso.

References

External links
 Samuel Monin at National Football Teams

Association football goalkeepers
Living people
Senegalese footballers
1979 births
Senegal international footballers
Raith Rovers F.C. players